Binnaway Parish is a civil Parish of Napier County, New South Wales, located on the Castlereagh River in central western New South Wales.

The parish is on the Gwabegar railway line. The only town of the parish is the railway junction of  Binnaway, New South Wales  and the economy of the parish is based on sheep.

The nearest man town  is Coonabarabran to the north.

References

Localities in New South Wales
Geography of New South Wales
Central West (New South Wales)